OPM is the first ever compilation album by Filipino singer Sarah Geronimo, released on December 22, 2008 in the Philippines by VIVA Records. It consists of OPM songs that she has released, may it be a single, an album track or a soundtrack. In 2010, it has been certified Platinum by the Philippine Association of the Record Industry, selling 25,000 copies in the country.

Track listing

Personnel
Credits were taken from Titik Pilipino.

 ACNE (at Homme et Femme) - black dress
 Paul Basinillo - creative director
 Grace Castaneda - creative team, digital imaging
 Comme De Garcon - black and white dress
 Vic Del Rosario, Jr. - executive producer
 Vincent Del Rosario - executive producer
 Denim, Inc. - album concept and design, creative team
 Dittle - creative team, illustrations
 Sarah Geronimo - lead vocals
 Baby A. Gil - supervising producer
 Guia Gil-Ferrer - associate producer
 Mia Marigomen - creative team
 Joel Mendoza - recording, mixing and mastering
 Joy Mongado - creative team, digital imaging
 MG O. Mozo - A&R direction
 Tony Ocampo - executive producer
 Eric Pe Benito - styling
 Ronnie Salvacion - photography
 Cary Santiago - black and white gown
 Juan Sarte - hair and make-up

Certifications

References

Sarah Geronimo albums
2008 compilation albums